The short-lived  of Japan was founded separately from Fukuoka Prefecture in December 1871 after the clan system was abolished earlier that year. It was made up of three separate han territories (Buzen, Kokura and Nakatsu) which were, each for a short while in 1871 themselves, called 'prefectures'.

Kokura prefecture included Moji, Kokura and other areas to the south and was formerly called Buzen Province. In 1876 Kokura prefecture was absorbed by Fukuoka prefecture. The city of Kokura was founded in 1900.

Kokura prefectural office (kencho)
The old wooden-built Kokura prefectural office (小倉県庁）is still standing in Kokura Kita ward, Kitakyushu though in a dilapidated condition. Used as a medical clinic and previously as a law court and a police station, it is opposite the ultra-modern Riverwalk Kitakyushu and is in stark contrast to it.

See also
 Prefectures of Japan

Kitakyushu
Former prefectures of Japan